Angela Golz (born 27 July 1969) is a German gymnast. She competed in six events at the 1984 Summer Olympics.

References

External links
 

1969 births
Living people
German female artistic gymnasts
Olympic gymnasts of West Germany
Gymnasts at the 1984 Summer Olympics
People from Birkenfeld (district)
Sportspeople from Rhineland-Palatinate